Jon Thorne (born 12 February 1967) is an English double bassist, producer and composer.

Career
Thorne is self-taught and started playing at the age of 23. He has studied and played jazz for a number of years following and considers Danny Thompson his bass mentor.

Renowned as a passionate, energetic and highly skilled performer, Thorne's career as a double bassist has spanned a broad range of the musical spectrum.

As bassist in the band Lamb since 1996, he has extensively used live double bass playing in electronic music and recorded 6 albums, toured 45 countries in 5 continents and played many of the world's leading music festivals including Coachella, Roskilde, Werchter, Glastonbury, Montreux Jazz, North Sea Jazz and NYC Central Park Summerstage. During the career of the successful group, Thorne acted as an unofficial third member with his most potent contribution on the group's second album Fear of Fours.

He has performed on MTV USA, MTV Europe and BBC television/radio, and has had music used in various British and European film, television and advertising media.

He leads an octet called Oedipus Mingus, which plays arrangements of the music of Charles Mingus.

He has also performed with and recorded on albums with artists as diverse as Scott Matthews, Liam Bailey, Robert Miles, Trilok Gurtu, Robert Fripp, Donovan, Guy Barker, Badly Drawn Boy, Kate Havnevik, Lou Rhodes, James Yorkston, King Creosote, John Smith, The Accidental, CocoRosie, Amos Lee, Jesca Hoop, The Memory Band, Mr Scruff and Steve and Martha Tilston.

He co-wrote six songs on the self-titled debut album by Love Amongst Ruin with drummer/vocalist Steve Hewitt, released in September 2010.

His debut album Manchester Road was released through SAM LTD/ EGEA records in 2006 featured 12 original compositions of jazz with pianist Steve Brown and drummer Luke Flowers.

His first orchestral suite Watching the Well, a Manchester Jazz Festival commission, written for and featuring legendary British bassist Danny Thompson, debuted at the Royal Northern College of Music in Manchester in 2007, and was released on the Naim label in November 2010 to strong critical acclaim.

In 2016, Thorne formed the trio Yorkston/Thorne/Khan alongside Scottish folk musician James Yorkston and New Delhi sarangi player Suhail Yusuf Khan. They released their debut album Everything Sacred that year, followed by a second album Neuk Wight Delhi All-Stars in 2017. Their third album, Navarasa: Nine Emotions, was released in January 2020.

Thorne is also a house music producer and DJ, performing as DJ Random. He occasionally teaches privately; his most notable students so far have been John Parker from Nizlopi and Nick Blacka from GoGo Penguin.

Personal life
Thorne was born in Rye Street Cottage Hospital in Bishop's Stortford, Hertfordshire. He lived in Rhodesia from the age of 6 to 11. Between ages 11 and 15 he lived in Salcombe in South Devon before heading north to Manchester, via Plumley, Knutsford, Northwich and Oldham.

Thorne now lives on the Isle of Wight. He is married and has three children and a kitten.

Selected discography

Solo
Homestead - album 2020
Watching the Well - album 2010
Manchester Road (as Jon Thorne's Oedipus Complex) - album 2006

With Yorkston/Thorne/Khan

Navarasa: Nine Emotions - album 2020
Neuk Wight Delhi All-Stars - album 2017
Everything Sacred - album 2016

With Lamb
Backspace_Unwind - album 2014
5 - album 2011
Live at Koko - album 2011
Remixed - album 2005
Best Kept Secrets - album and DVD 2004
Between Darkness and Wonder - album 2003
Fear of Fours - album 1998
Lamb - album 1996

Other collaborations
Humm, Malojain - album 2020
Let Your Weirdness Carry You Home, Malojian - album 2017
Hypoxia, Kathryn Williams - album 2015
Salvor, Falselights - album 2015
Charms Against Sorrow, Hannah Sanders - album 2015
The Sea, Martha Tilston - album 2014
Definitely Now, Liam Bailey - album 2014
The Cellardyke Recording And Wassailing Society, James Yorkston - album 2014
Crown Electric, Kathryn Williams - album 2013
Phonograph, Jesca Hoop - single 2013
Great Lakes, John Smith - album 2013
World Without Form, Nat Birchall - album 2013
Machines of Love and Grace, Martha Tilston - album 2012
I Was a Cat from a Book, James Yorkston - album 2012
As the Sun Comes Up, Jay Leighton - album 2011
Thirteen, Robert Miles - album 2011
Snowglobe, Jesca Hoop - album 2011
Oh My Days, The Memory Band - album 2011
Lucy and the Wolves, Martha Tilston - album 2010
One Good Thing, Lou Rhodes - album 2010
Map or Direction, John Smith - album 2009
Folk Songs, James Yorkston - The Analogue Catalogue Sessions, CD/DVD 2009
Ninja Tuna, Mr Scruff - 2008
Hairy Bumpercress, Mr Scruff - 12" 2008
Bloom, Lou Rhodes - album 2007
Migrating Bird, The Songs of Lal Waterson - Various (with James Yorkston) - album 2007
 Cortina Deluxx - Debut EP 10" vinyl 2006
Of Milkmaids and Architects, Martha Tilston - album 2006
Beloved One, Lou Rhodes - album (as composer) 2006
Miles/Gurtu, Robert Miles/Trilok Gurtu - album 2004
Back to Mine LP, MJ Cole - album (with The John Ellis Big Bang) 2002

References

External links

English double-bassists
Male double-bassists
Living people
People from Bishop's Stortford
People from Whalley Range
1967 births
Musicians from Hertfordshire
21st-century double-bassists
21st-century British male musicians